Døstrup is a village with a population of 315 (1 January 2022) in Southern Jutland in Denmark. Døstrup is located six kilometers south of Skærbæk, seven kilometers north of Bredebro and 22 kilometers north of Tønder.

References

Cities and towns in the Region of Southern Denmark
Tønder Municipality